The Vision Award - Nescens both highlights and pays tribute to someone whose creative work behind the scenes, as well as in their own right, has contributed to opening up new perspectives in film.

Hall of Fame 

 2013: Douglas Trumbull
 2014: Garrett Brown
 2015: Walter Murch

References

Special effects awards